The 1947 Bowling Green Falcons football team was an American football team that represented Bowling Green State University as an independent during the 1947 college football season. In its seventh season under head coach Robert Whittaker, the team compiled a 5–5 record and was outscored by a total of 149 to 134.  Wayne Bloker and James Knierim were the team captains. The team played its home games at University Stadium in Bowling Green, Ohio.

Schedule

References

Bowling Green
Bowling Green Falcons football seasons
Bowling Green Falcons football